The 2006–07 Vanderbilt Commodores men's basketball men's basketball team finished with a 22–12 record (SEC East: 10–6, 2nd) and reached the Sweet 16 of the NCAA tournament. The Commodores were ranked No. 19 in the final ESPN/USA Today (Coaches) poll.

The team was led by head coach Kevin Stallings and played its home games at Memorial Gymnasium.

Preseason outlook
Entering the season, Vanderbilt was picked by the media attending the SEC's media days in October to finish 4th in a strong SEC East, behind the defending national champion Florida, Kentucky and Tennessee. They returned three starters: swingmen Shan Foster and Derrick Byars and point guard Alex Gordon. Foster was their leading scorer last season and was the third-leading returning scorer in the SEC. Vanderbilt lost two starters: Julian Terrell, their top rebounder (7.2 rpg), and rising-junior DeMarre Carroll, their second-leading scorer (12.1 ppg). Terrell graduated, while Carroll unexpectedly decided to transfer to Missouri shortly after the 2005–06 season ended, a decision influenced by the fact that Mizzou's new head coach Mike Anderson is his uncle.

Junior Shan Foster was named by the league's coaches to the preseason all-SEC first team.

Regular season
The Commodores got off to a rocky 1–3 start that included an embarrassing home loss to Furman (15–16 final record, 8–10 Southern Conference). After that, Vanderbilt won 17 of their next 22 games, culminating in an 83–70 home win over then-No. 1 Florida (33–5, SEC East: 14–2, 1st). They entered the NCAA Tournament winning only 2 of their last 5 games, including two losses to Arkansas (21–14, SEC West: 7–9, 3rd), but one of the wins was a come-from-behind 67–65 home win over Kentucky (22–12, SEC East: 9–7, 4th), their fourth straight win over the Wildcats.

Vanderbilt finished the regular season tied for 2nd with Tennessee (24–11, SEC East: 10–6) in the SEC East, four games behind eventual national champion Florida (35–5, SEC East: 14–2, 1st).

NCAA tournament
The Commodores were the No. 6 seed in the East Regional and lost 66–65 to No. 2 seeded Georgetown (30–6, Big East: 13–3, 1st) at East Rutherford, New Jersey. The Commodores defeated No. 11 seeded George Washington (23–9, A-10: 11–5, 3rd) in the first round, 77–44, and No. 3 seeded Washington State (26–7, Pac-10: 13–5, 2nd), 78–74, in two overtimes, at ARCO Arena in Sacramento, California, before losing to Georgetown.

Awards
Following the end of the regular season, head coach Kevin Stallings was named SEC Coach of the Year by his fellow SEC coaches, while senior Derrick Byars was named SEC Player of the Year by the league coaches (the AP chose Chris Lofton of Tennessee). Stallings has now led the Commodores to 20 wins in three of the last four seasons. Byars led the Commodores in scoring with 17.0 points per game and was a unanimous selection to the All-SEC first team. Junior Shan Foster, who averaged 15.6 points per game, was named to the All-SEC second team.

Including NCAA Tournament games, Vanderbilt finished the season 7–3 against teams ranked in the Top 25. Only North Carolina and UCLA had more wins against ranked opponents

Roster and individual statistics

2006–07 schedule and results

|-
!colspan=9| Exhibition

|-
!colspan=9| Regular season

|-
!colspan=9| SEC tournament

|-
!colspan=9| NCAA tournament

References

Vanderbilt Commodores men's basketball seasons
Vanderbilt
Vanderbilt Commodores men's basketball
Vanderbilt Commodores men's basketball
Vanderbilt